KAOK (1400 AM) is a radio station broadcasting a News Talk Information format. Licensed to Lake Charles, Louisiana, United States, the station serves the Lake Charles area.  The station is currently owned by Cumulus Media and features programming from Fox News Radio, Premiere Networks, and Westwood One.  Its studios are located on Broad Street in downtown Lake Charles and its transmitter is at the intersection of Fruge Street (US 90) and I-210.

KAOK began as a member of the "OK Group" which included WAOK, WBOK, KYOK, and others and was known as serving the African-American community. Thomas Austin Gresham (1921–2015), a 1946 graduate of Louisiana State University in Baton Rouge who was born in Buenos Aires, Argentina, opened KLOU in Lake Charles and was manager and part owner of KAOK as well. In 1959, he came to Shreveport to manage KRMD and was the executor of the T. B. Lanford estate. Gresham was also a decorated first lieutenant with the 8th Air Force of the United States Army Air Corps in England during World War II. He flew twenty combat missions in B-17 bombers.

Ed J. Prendergast subsequently managed and then purchased the station. He moved to a Top 40 format, a popular mainstream form of radio entertainment.

During the 1970s, KAOK was a competitive and high-profile radio station within the Lake Charles market, featuring remote live broadcasts from many of the station's accounts, as well as seemingly infinite amounts of sock hops and dances hosted by KAOK personalities and mobile DJ pioneers Dave "The Mouse" Petrik, who was also the station's chief engineer. The station also simulcast on one of the local cable channels during this period. One memorable KAOK promotion was the "Boogie Bash", a dance featuring KAOK radio DJ Dave the Mouse as well as the other stations personalities, Bill Conway, Steve Golden, and Ken Rice. During the summer of 1973, a series of these dances, provided some much needed youth night life, melding well with the station's Top 40 appeal. At its peak, the station featured personalities such as Dave "The Mouse" Petrik, Ken Rice, Steve Golden, Jay Michaels, and Bill Conway, as well as long time local personalities Terry Broussard, Bubba Lutcher and the Fondel Funeral Home shows, airing on Sunday mornings. After its heyday, the station struggled and eventually evolved into a talk format with Prendergast as the morning host. Ultimately, the station changed ownership several times, including ownership by Sidney Simien, known as Rockin' Sidney, a Zydeco musician who recorded the hit "Don't Mess with My Toot Toot".

A local physician, Marc Pittman, had assisted Ed Prendergast with the transition to a full talk format in the late 1980s, and also assisted with the sale of the station to Rockin' Sidney.  In 1997, when Sidney's health was failing from cancer, Mr. Simien asked Dr. Pittman to assist in an unsuccessful attempt to sell the station.  When no one would meet Rockin' Sidney's price for the sale, Dr. Pittman created Pittman Broadcasting Services, LLC and applied to the FCC to purchase the station at the requested price.  The FCC finally granted the application days before Rockin' Sidney Simien died.

Pittman Broadcasting continued with the talk format, and created KQLK-FM for the Lake Charles market. At 3 AM, Sunday, February 11, 2001, the day before KQLK-FM was to debut, the Pittman Broadcasting studios were hit with a massive electrical power surge.  The studios were burned and melted to the ground reportedly in less than 8 minutes. Utilizing an internet signal and the new KQLK-FM tower in Longville, LA, KAOK-AM was back on the air as a simulcast within 24 hours of the disaster. This would not have been possible without the assistance from local independent broadcasters and engineers, as well as the tireless effort of the Pittman Broadcasting staff.  Both stations were later sold to Cumulus Media in 2004.

A fire destroyed the building and all of the facilities, and eventually the frequency was sold to the Cumulus Media who broadcast a conservative talk format. From 9 to 11 a.m. weekdays, KAOK broadcasts The Moon Griffon Show.

References

External links

AOK
Cumulus Media radio stations